Badnam Farishte  is a 1971 Bollywood court drama film. The film has Rajesh Khanna and Sharmila Tagore as lawyers who fight for unemployed youth who had gotten into the crime world. These two actors made extended guest appearances in this film. The introduction commentary was done by Dharmendra. The cast included mostly the newcomers and struggling artistes of that time.

Music
The film's music was composed by N. Dutta and penned by Asad Bhopali.

"Na Saathi Hai Na Manzil Ka Pata, Ye Duniya Raasta Hi Raasta Hai" - Asha Bhosle
"Aaj Ka Vaada Pakka Haath Milao, Ab Mai Jaau Achchha Haath Milao" - Mahendra Kapoor, Asha Bhosle
"Insaan Ro Raha Hai, Badnam Farishte Kya Kare" - Mohammed Rafi
"B.a. M.a. Ph.d Ye Diplome Ye Degree Hogayi Jab Bekaar" - Mohammed Rafi
"Nashili Aankho Se Nagar Sa Ek Baras Ke Dub Gayi Masti Me Meri Nas Nas" - Asha Bhosle

References

External links
 

1971 films
1970s Hindi-language films
1971 drama films
Films scored by Datta Naik